Shihtienfenia was a pareiasaurid parareptile from the Late Permian of China.

Species

Lee (1997) refers to S. xuecunensis as a metaspecies lacking the autapomorphies of Shihtienfenia. Tsuji & Müller (2009) seem to consider it a valid taxon for cladistic analysis, and like Lee 1997 place the two Chinese species close to Pareiasuchus.

S. permica (Young and Yeh, 1963); The skull of this pareiasaur is unknown. It is known originally from a number of isolated vertebrae, jaws, and limb-bones and an incomplete skeleton, all from the Shiqianfeng locality near Baode, Shanxi, part of the Sunjiagou Formation. Shanshisaurus xuecunensis Cheng, 1980 and Huanghesaurus liuliensis Gao, 1983 are synonyms.

S. completus (Wang, Yi and Liu, 2019); The first pareiasaur skull from Asia came from this species.

Classification
Shihtienfenia is unusual because of the presence of 6, rather than the usual 4, sacral vertebrae, and may belong in a separate subfamily, although Oskar Kuhn includes it under the Pareiasaurines in his monograph (Kuhn 1969). As with the Pareiasaurines the upper margin of the ilium is flat.

References

External links
 Pareiasaurinae at Palaeos

Pareiasaurs
Permian reptiles of Asia
Permian China
Prehistoric animals of China
Fossil taxa described in 1963
Taxa named by Yang Zhongjian
Prehistoric reptile genera